The 2015–16 season was Exeter City's 114th year in existence and their fourth consecutive season in League Two. Along with competing in League Two, the club also participated in the FA Cup, League Cup and League Trophy. The season covered the period from 1 July 2015 to 30 June 2016.

Transfers

Transfers in

Transfers out

Loans in

Loans out

Competitions

Pre-season friendlies
On 18 May 2015, Exeter City announced that Brazilian side Fluminense will bring an under-19 squad to face in a pre-season friendly on 20 July 2015. A day later Exeter City announced a second friendly against Weston-super-Mare. On 20 May 2015, Torquay United was added to the schedule. A pre-season trip to Scotland was confirmed on 21 May 2015. On 8 June 2015, a visit from AFC Bournemouth was confirmed. A friendly against Sheffield United was announced a day later. On 16 June it was announced that an Exeter City XI would play Bodmin Town.

League Two

League table

Results summary
Exeter City gained 29 points at home and picked up 35 points away, adding up to 64 in total.

Results by round
Exeter were a mid-table club for the entire season, spending two matchdays in the play-offs zone and falling to as low as 17th after a four-game losing streak in December and early January. For the first half of the season, the club's form was very inconsistent. From December onwards, Exeter suffered a four-game losing streak which was closely followed by a three-game winning streak. Then followed four matches without a win and  a ten-match unbeaten run.

Despite this unbeaten streak, Exeter remained in fourteenth place from 20 February to 25 March. After a 2–0 win away at Crawley, Exeter rose to 11th in the table, 5 points off the play-offs zone. On 2 April 2016 and 9 April 2016, Exeter achieved a double against local rivals Plymouth Argyle and Yeovil Town, resulting in their continued rise up the table. After the latter match, Exeter were 9th, 2 places and on equal points with AFC Wimbledon and Wycombe Wanderers, although with an inferior goal difference.

This unbeaten streak, along with Exeter's realistic play-off hopes was broken by a 3–2 home loss to Mansfield Town. Exeter were mathematically confirmed to be remaining in League Two after another loss to Bristol Rovers. Exeter finished the season back in 14th position after suffering a 4–1 routing away to Luton.

Matches
On 17 June 2015, the fixtures for the 2015–16 season were announced.

Score overview

Note: Exeter City goals are listed first.

FA Cup
During the First Round Proper draw on 26 October 2015, Exeter were drawn against 8th-tier side Didcot Town. For the second round, Exeter faced League One team Port Vale, winning the fixture 2–0. During the draw for the third round, Exeter were drawn against Premier League side Liverpool. The match ended with a draw as Liverpool fielded a largely inexperienced side and was televised on BBC One. A rematch was played at Anfield on 20 January. It was reported that the two matches against Liverpool could eventually result in a £1,000,000 windfall for Exeter City. This amount was eventually revealed to be £700,000 Exeter were thoroughly overpowered in the replay, losing 3–0. Liverpool had 26 shots, compared to Exeter's 4.

League Cup
On 16 June 2015, the first round draw was made, Exeter City were drawn away against Swindon Town. On 11 August 2015, Exeter won against Swindon Town 2–1 with goals from David Wheeler and Alex Nicholls at the County Ground. On 13 August 2015, the second round draw was made and Exeter City were drawn away against Premier League team Sunderland. Sunderland scored two early goals before Exeter equalised through Emmanuel Oyeleke and David Wheeler. The score was 3–3 at half-time, which became 6–3 to Sunderland at full-time as Exeter's defence failed, including an incident where goalkeeper Bobby Olejnik was caught off his line. This is the most goals Exeter have conceded all season so far, and was the second of five games in the season in which Exeter lost by three goals.

Football League Trophy
On 8 August 2015, live on Soccer AM the draw for the first round of the Football League Trophy was drawn by Toni Duggan and Alex Scott. Grecians hosted Portsmouth and won the match 2–0, advancing to the next round. The draw for the second round was held on 5 September 2015, again live on Soccer AM. Exeter were drawn against rivals Plymouth Argyle.

Squad statistics
Source:

Numbers in parentheses denote appearances as substitute.
Players with squad numbers struck through and marked  left the club during the playing season.
Players with names in italics and marked * were on loan from another club for the whole of their season with Wycombe.
Players listed with no appearances have been in the matchday squad but only as unused substitutes.
Key to positions: GK – Goalkeeper; DF – Defender; MF – Midfielder; FW – Forward

References

Exeter City
Exeter City F.C. seasons